Steeler may refer to:

Music
 Steeler (American band), a 1981–1984 heavy metal band
 Steeler (American band album), 1983
 Steeler (German band), a 1981–1988 heavy metal band, or their 1984 debut album
 "Steeler", a song by Judas Priest from British Steel, 1980

Other uses
 Steel worker, a person who works in the process of making steel
 Steeler (G.I. Joe), a character in the G.I. Joe universe
 Steeler (train), on the Pennsylvania Railroad, US

See also
 Stealer
 Stele
 Steel (disambiguation)
 Steel worker (disambiguation)
 Steelers (disambiguation)